Synchronised swimming is one of the sports at the quadrennial Commonwealth Games competition. It has been a Commonwealth Games sport since 1986. It is an optional sport and may, or may not, be included in the sporting programme of each edition of the Games.

Editions

All-time medal table

External links
Commonwealth Games sport index

 
Sports at the Commonwealth Games
Commonwealth Games